Rollingwood is a census-designated place (CDP) in Contra Costa County, California, United States.  As of the 2010 census, Rollingwood's population was 2,969.

Geography

History

The federal government contracted David Bohannon, one of the nation's lead mass production developers, to develop Rollingwood. Federal officials approved bank loans to finance construction, requiring that the homes not be sold to African-Americans.

In 1952, Wilbur Gary, an African-American navy war veteran, former shipyard worker, and building contractor, purchased a home in Rollingwood from fellow navy war veteran Lieutenant Commander Sidney Hogan. Gary's purchase provoked anger among residents of the formerly all-white town. Soon after the Garys arrived, a mob of 300 white residents gathered in front of Gary's house. The mob shouted racial epithets, hurled a brick through the family's window, and burned a cross on their front lawn.

Demographics

2010
The 2010 United States Census reported that Rollingwood had a population of 2,969. The racial makeup of Rollingwood was 1,130 (38.1%) White, 220 (7.4%) African American, 28 (0.9%) Native American, 534 (18.0%) Asian, 22 (0.7%) Pacific Islander, 907 (30.5%) from other races, and 128 (4.3%) from two or more races. Hispanic or Latino of any race were 1,836 persons (61.8%).

The Census reported that 99.8% of the population lived in households and 0.2% were institutionalized.

There were 729 households, out of which 398 (54.6%) had children under the age of 18 living in them, 438 (60.1%) were opposite-sex married couples living together, 129 (17.7%) had a female householder with no husband present, 57 (7.8%) had a male householder with no wife present.  There were 29 (4.0%) unmarried opposite-sex partnerships, and 7 (1.0%) same-sex married couples or partnerships. 70 households (9.6%) were made up of individuals, and 35 (4.8%) had someone living alone who was 65 years of age or older. The average household size was 4.06.  There were 624 families (85.6% of all households); the average family size was 4.31.

The population was spread out, with 848 people (28.6%) under the age of 18, 366 people (12.3%) aged 18 to 24, 836 people (28.2%) aged 25 to 44, 669 people (22.5%) aged 45 to 64, and 250 people (8.4%) who were 65 years of age or older.  The median age was 31.1 years. For every 100 females, there were 97.5 males.  For every 100 females age 18 and over, there were 99.0 males.

The homeowner vacancy rate was 1.8%; the rental vacancy rate was 6.3%.  1,945 people (65.5% of the population) lived in owner-occupied housing units and 1,018 people (34.3%) lived in rental housing units.

2000
As of the census of 2000, there were 2,900 people, 734 households, and 629 families residing in the CDP. The racial makeup of the CDP was 33.14% White, 10.41% Black or African American, 1.10% Native American, 23.79% Asian, 0.45% Pacific Islander, 24.52% from other races, and 6.59% from two or more races.  42.24% of the population were Hispanic or Latino of any race.

There were 734 households, out of which 51.1% had children under the age of 18 living with them, 59.3% were married couples living together, 20.4% had a female householder with no husband present, and 14.2% were non-families. 11.7% of all households were made up of individuals, and 6.1% had someone living alone who was 65 years of age or older.  The average household size was 3.94 and the average family size was 4.23.

In the CDP, the population was spread out, with 33.3% under the age of 18, 10.6% from 18 to 24, 29.8% from 25 to 44, 17.4% from 45 to 64, and 9.0% who were 65 years of age or older.  The median age was 30 years. For every 100 females, there were 96.1 males.  For every 100 females age 18 and over, there were 93.1 males.

The median income for a household in the CDP was $48,229, and the median income for a family was $51,875. Males had a median income of $31,048 versus $27,500 for females. The per capita income for the CDP was $13,428.  About 12.0% of families and 12.8% of the population were below the poverty line, including 15.7% of those under age 18 and 6.0% of those age 65 or over.

Education
Rollingwood is in the West Contra Costa Unified School District.

References

Census-designated places in Contra Costa County, California
Census-designated places in California